Michael Eagar (born ) is a former Ireland international rugby league footballer who played in the 1990s and 2000s.

Background
Eagar was born in Newcastle, New South Wales, Australia.

Career
He played for the Newcastle Knights and the South Queensland Crushers in Australia and the Warrington Wolves, the Castleford Tigers (Heritage № 756) and Hull F.C. in the Super League. Eagar was a popular player whilst playing for Castleford Tigers.

Eagar was an Ireland international and played at the 2000 Rugby League World Cup.

References

External links

1973 births
Living people
Australian people of Irish descent
Australian rugby league players
Castleford Tigers players
Hull F.C. players
Ireland national rugby league team players
Newcastle Knights players
Rugby league centres
Rugby league five-eighths
Rugby league fullbacks
Rugby league players from Newcastle, New South Wales
South Queensland Crushers players
Warrington Wolves players